This is an alphabetical list of songs written or co–written by American songwriter John Rich.

"Song" – Artist(s) (co–writers)

0–9
"8th of November" – Big & Rich (Big Kenny)
"20 Maragaritas" – Big & Rich (Big Kenny)

A
"Ain't Broke Yet" – Cowboy Troy (Big Kenny, Cowboy Troy)
"Ain't Gonna Stop" – James Otto (Big Kenny, James Otto, Nikki Sixx)
"All Jacked Up" – Gretchen Wilson (Gretchen Wilson)
"Amarillo Sky" – McBride & the Ride, Jason Aldean (Big Kenny, Rodney Clawson, Bart Pursley)
"Another You" – John Rich (Marv Green)
"Attitude" – Wynonna Judd (Wynonna Judd)
"Automatic" – Cowboy Troy (Cowboy Troy, Adam Shoenfeld)

B
"The Bed" – Gretchen Wilson with Big & Rich (Keith Anderson, Vicky McGehee)
"Big Al's Buffalo Club Medley" – Big & Rich (Big Kenny)
"Big Man" – Shannon Brown (Shannon Brown, Vicky McGehee)
"Big Time" – Big & Rich (Big Kenny, Angie Aparo)
"Breaking Your Heart" – Cheyenne Kimball (Cheyenne Kimball, Vicky McGehee)
"Brown Liquor" – John Anderson (John Phillips, Shannon Lawson)

C
"California Girls" – Gretchen Wilson (Gretchen Wilson, Mark Wright)
"Can't Do It Today" – Gary Allan (Rodney Clawson, Vicky McGehee)
"Caught Up in the Moment" – Big & Rich (Big Kenny)
"Come Cryin' to Me" – Lonestar (Mark D. Sander TV s, Wally Wilson)
"Come to Bed" – Gretchen Wilson with John Rich (Vicky McGehee)
"Comin' to Your City" – Big & Rich (Big Kenny)
"Corn Fed" – Shannon Brown (Shannon Brown, Vicky McGehee)
"Comin' Back for You" – Keith Harling (Chris Waters, Tom Shapiro)
"Country Done Come to Town" – John Rich (Vicky McGehee)
"Crazy Nights" – Lonestar (Chris Waters, Tom Shapiro)
"Crick in My Neck" – Cowboy Troy with Big & Rich (Cowboy Troy)

D
"Deadwood Mountain" – Big & Rich (Big Kenny)
"Does Your Daddy Know About Me" – Lonestar (Larry Boone, Paul Nelson)
"Drink & Dial" – James Otto (Vicky McGehee, James Otto)
"Drinkin' 'bout You" – Big & Rich (Big Kenny)
"Drive Myself to Drink" – John Rich (Vicky McGehee, James Otto)

E
"El Tejano" – Cowboy Troy (Cowboy Troy)
"Everybody Wants to Be Me" – John Rich (Vicky McGehee)

F
"The Faster I Go" – David Kersh (Larry Boone, Paul Nelson
"Filthy Rich" – Big & Rich (Big Kenny, Bill McDavid, Freddy Powers, Sonny Throckmorton)
"For the Kids" – John Rich
"The Freak Parade" – Big & Rich (Big Kenny)
"Funky Country" – John Anderson (John Anderson)

G
"The Good Lord and the Man" – John Rich
"Good Ole Boy" – Gretchen Wilson (Vicky McGehee, Gretchen Wilson)
"Good Ole Days" – Shannon Brown (Blair Daly, Shane Mack)

H
"Here for the Party" – Gretchen Wilson
"Hick Chick" – Cowboy Troy with Angela Hacker (Cowboy Troy)
"Hicktown" – Jason Aldean (Big Kenny, Vicky McGehee)
"High Five" – Big & Rich (Big Kenny, Adam Shoenfeld)
"High Horses" – Shannon Brown (Blair Daly, Julian Bunetta)
"Holy Water" – Big & Rich (Big Kenny, Vicky McGehee, Jeff Cohen)
"Hook 'em Horns" – Cowboy Troy (Big Kenny, Cowboy Troy)

I
"I Can't Make Her Cry Anymore" – John Anderson (Shannon Lawson, John Anderson)
"I Confess" – Randy Owen (James Otto, Randy Owen)
"I Don't Want to Lose Your Love" – John Rich (Vicky McGehee)
"I Love 'em All" – Shannon Brown (Shannon Brown, Vicky McGehee)
"I Love the Way You Do That" – Lonestar (Don Cook, Wally Wilson)
"I Love You Like That" – John Rich (Big Kenny, Rodney Clawson)
"I Play Chicken with the Train" – Cowboy Troy with Big & Rich (Angie Aparo, Cowboy Troy)
"I Pray for You" – Big Kenny, John Rich, Big & Rich (Big Kenny)
"I Thought You'd Never Ask" – John Rich (John Anderson)
"I'm Just a Man" – Jason Aldean (Chad Brock, Vicky McGehee)
"If Her Lovin' Don't Kill Me" – Aaron Tippin, John Anderson (Vicky McGehee, Tim Womack)
"If You Don't Wanna Love Me" – Cowboy Troy with Sarah Buxton (Cowboy Troy)

J
"Jalapeño" – Big & Rich (Big Kenny)
"John Doe on a John Deere" – Lonestar (Don Cook, Conley White)
"Johnny Cash" – Tracy Byrd, Jason Aldean
"Joyce Is My Choice" – Big & Rich (Big Kenny)

K
"Kick My Ass" – Big & Rich (Big Kenny, Bryan Wayne)
"Kill Me Now" – Rio Grand (Anthony L. Smith, Vicky McGehee)

L
"Leap of Faith" – Big & Rich (Big Kenny)
"Let's Pretend We're Strangers For the Night" – Randy Owen (Shannon Lawson, Randy Owen)
"Like We Never Loved at All" – Faith Hill with Tim McGraw (Vicky McGehee, Scot Sax)
"Live This Life" – Big & Rich with Martina McBride (Big Kenny)
"Lock Me Up" – Cowboy Troy with Angela Hacker and John Rich (Cowboy Troy, Max Abrams)
"Lost in This Moment" – Big & Rich, Keith Anderson (Rodney Clawson, Keith Anderson)
"Love Train" – Big & Rich (Big Kenny, Jon Nicholson)
"Love Won't Listen" – John Rich (Sharon Vaughn, L. David Lewis)

M
"Mack Truck" - John Rich with Kid Rock (Adam Shoenfeld)
"Man with the Microphone" – Cowboy Troy (Cowboy Troy)
"Mississippi Girl" – Faith Hill (Adam Shoenfeld)
"My Last Yee Haw" – Cowboy Troy with Big & Rich (Big Kenny, Cowboy Troy)

N
"Never Been Down" – Big & Rich (Big Kenny)
"Never Mind Me" – Big & Rich (Big Kenny, Rodney Clawson)
"New Jerusalem" – John Rich (Jim Rich, Chris Waters, Tom Shapiro)
"No One Can Love You Anymore" – Randy Owen (Randy Owen, Vicky McGehee)
"Not Bad for a Bartender" – Gretchen Wilson (Vicky McGehee, Gretchen Wilson)

O
"Old Blue Mountain" – John Rich (Big Kenny)
"Once a Woman Gets a Hold of Your Heart" – Heartland (Richie McDonald)
"One Bud Wiser" – Gretchen Wilson (Vicky McGehee)
"Our America" – Big & Rich with Gretchen Wilson and Cowboy Troy (traditional; arranged by John Rich, Big Kenny, Gretchen Wilson, Paul Worley)

P
"Paranoid Like Me ('Tis the Season of Discontent)" – Cowboy Troy (Cowboy Troy)
"Pickin' Wildflowers" – Keith Anderson (Keith Anderson, Kim Williams)
"Please Man" – Big & Rich with Wyclef Jean (Wyclef Jean)
"Pocahontas Proud" – Gretchen Wilson (Vicky McGehee, Gretchen Wilson)

Q

R
"Raining on Me" – Gretchen Wilson (Vicky McGehee, Gretchen Wilson)
"Real World" – Big & Rich (Big Kenny, Adam Shoenfeld)
"Redneck Woman" – Gretchen Wilson (Gretchen Wilson)
"Rollin' (The Ballad of Big & Rich)" – Big & Rich with Cowboy Troy (Big Kenny, Cowboy Troy)

S
"Save a Horse (Ride a Cowboy)" – Big & Rich (Big Kenny)
"Saved" – Big & Rich (Big Kenny, John Phillips)
"Say When" – Lonestar (Larry Boone, Paul Nelson)
"She Brings the Lightning Down" – John Rich, Shannon Brown (Vicky McGehee)
"She Doesn't Know She's Got It" – Blake Shelton (Chris Waters, Tom Shapiro)
"She's a Butterfly" – Martina McBride with Big & Rich, John Rich (Big Kenny)
"Shut Up About Politics" – John Rich with The Five
"Shuttin' Detroit Down" – John Rich (John Anderson)
"Simplify" - John Rich (Big Kenny, Brian Wayne Galentine)
"Six Foot Town" – Big & Rich (Big Kenny)
"Skoal Ring" – Gretchen Wilson (Vicky McGehee, Gretchen Wilson)
"Slow Motion" – Big & Rich (Big Kenny)
"Someday" – John Rich (Big Kenny)
"Something to Believe In" – John Rich (Big Kenny, Rodney Clawson)
"Son of a Preacher Man" – John Rich (Vicky McGehee)
"Soul Shaker" – Big & Rich (Big Kenny, Rodney Clawson)
"Steel Bridges" – John Rich (Sharon Vaughn, Jonnie Most)
"Stomp" – Crossin Dixon (Rodney Clawson, Blair Daly)
"Sunset Man" – James Otto (Shannon Lason, James Otto)
"Sunshine and Summertime" – Faith Hill (Rodney Clawson, Kylie Sackley)

T
"Texas" - John Rich with Cowboy Troy (Adam Shoenfeld)
"There Goes the Neighborhood" – Gretchen Wilson (Vicky McGehee, Gretchen Wilson)
"Three Chord Country & American Rock & Roll" – Keith Anderson (Keith Anderson)
"Trucker Man" – John Rich (Vicky McGehee)
"Turn a Country Boy On" – John Rich (Vicky McGehee)
"Turn to Me" – Shannon Brown (Gretchen Wilson, Vicky Mcgehee)

U
"Unbreakable" – Katrina Elam (Katrina Elam, Vicky McGehee)
"Underneath the Same Moon" – John Rich, Blake Shelton (Sharon Vaughn, L. David Lewis)

V

W
"The Way I Loved You" – Taylor Swift (Taylor Swift)
"We Got It Going On" – Bon Jovi with Big & Rich (Big Kenny, Jon Bon Jovi, Richie Sambora)
"What Do We Do With the Rest of the Night" – Lonestar (Sharon Rice, Wally Wilson)
"When I Think About Cheatin'" – Gretchen Wilson (Vicky McGehee, Gretchen Wilson)
"When It Rains" – Gretchen Wilson (Vicky McGehee, Gretchen Wilson)
"Who's Kissing You Tonight" – Jason Aldean (Tom Shapiro, Chris Waters)
"Whoop Whoop" – Cowboy Troy (Vicky McGehee, Cowboy Troy)
"Why" – Shannon Brown, Jason Aldean (Rodney Clawson, Vicky McGehee)
"Why Does Somebody Always Have to Die" – John Rich (Vicky McGehee)
"Wild West Show" – Big & Rich (Big Kenny, Blair Daly)
"A Woman Knows" – John Anderson (Vicky McGehee, Julie Roberts)
"Wrap Around" – Keith Anderson (Keith Anderson, Kim Williams)
"Wrap Around the World" – Cowboy Troy with Big & Rich (Cowboy Troy)

X

Y
"You Don't Have to Go Home" – Gretchen Wilson (Vicky McGehee, Gretchen Wilson)
"You Had Me From Hell No" - John Rich with Lil Jon (Kylie Sackley)
"You Never Stop Loving Somebody" – Big & Rich (Big Kenny)
"You're the Love I Wanna Be In" – Jason Aldean (Jason Aldean, Vicky McGehee)
"You Rock Me" - John Rich (Adam Shoenfeld)

Z

References
[ List of songs written by John Rich] at Allmusic

Rich, John